Athiyandal is a village in Tiruvannamalai taluk, Tiruvannamalai district, Tamil Nadu State. The nearest towns are Thandrampet (15.2 km), Thurinjapuram (18.1 km), Kalasapakkam (23.1 km), Keelpennathur (24.4 km). Palani utthandi house avalabile acc cricket team, minnal nanbarkal, pa ranjith fans club.

Speciality
Athiyandal "Rangammal Trust" is a world-famous Britisher's trust. It provides schools, free hospitals, medical college and polytechnic colleges. "Athiyandal Rangammal Hospital" is well known after CMC to north zone people.

Demographics
Athiyandal having population of around 6000 people providing suburban to Tiruvannamalai urbanity. One of the major medical institutions in Ramana Maharshi rangammal hospital, comes under Tiruvannamalai urban agglomerations on  Bengaluru road (via Chengam) NH-66. It is well known for its local railway station for Athiyandal as "Athiyandal Rangammal Campus and Hospital" shortly as "ARCH" at Girivalam railway route (local railway route to develop tourism).

Cities and towns in Tiruvannamalai district